The South African Railways Class 34-200 of 1971 is a diesel-electric locomotive.

Between October 1971 and March 1972, the South African Railways placed fifty Class 34-200 General Motors Electro-Motive Division type GT26MC diesel-electric locomotives in service.

Manufacturer
The Class 34-200 type GT26MC diesel-electric locomotive was designed and built for the South African Railways (SAR) by General Motors Electro-Motive Division (GM-EMD) at their McCook plant in Illinois.

Class 34 series

GE and GM-EMD designs
Both manufacturers also produced locomotives for the South African Classes 33, 35 and 36.

Distinguishing features
Of the GM-EMD Class 34 series locomotives, Classes 34-200 and 34-600 units are visually indistinguishable from one another, but they can be distinguished from the Class 34-800 by the thicker fishbelly-shaped sills on their left hand sides compared to the straight sill on the left hand side of the Class .

Service

South Africa
The Class 34-200 were mostly destined for use in the Cape Midlands, but was imported through Durban harbour since Port Elizabeth harbour did not have facilities to handle these large mainline diesel-electrics. The locomotives arrived fully assembled and were hauled inland from Durban Harbour in blocks of 16 to 18 units, each worked by four new Class 6E1 units. Reports at the time indicated that the locomotives would be worked directly to the Cape Midlands via Bethlehem, Kroonstad and Bloemfontein to Port Elizabeth. Since at least one of these loads was photographed between Germiston and Pretoria, it is more likely that they first went to Koedoespoort in Pretoria for commissioning before being released for service on the Cape Midlands.

The Class  eventually worked on most mainlines and some unelectrified branch lines in the central, eastern, northern and northeastern parts of South Africa. By the 2010s a significant number of them were observed at Richards Bay, Empangeni, Vryheid and Ermelo.

NLPI Ltd.
NLPI Limited (abbreviated from New Limpopo Projects Investments), a Mauritius-registered company, specialises in private sector investments by using the build-operate-transfer (BOT) concept. It had three connected railway operations in Zimbabwe and Zambia, which formed a rail link between South Africa and the Democratic Republic of Congo.
 The Beitbridge Bulawayo Railway (BBR), commissioned on 1 September 1999, operates the Beit Bridge to Bulawayo line in Zimbabwe.
 From February 2004, NLPI Logistics (NLL or LOG) operated between Bulawayo and Victoria Falls on the Zimbabwe-Zambia border.
 From February 2003, the Railway Systems of Zambia (RSZ) operated on the former Zambian Railways (ZR) from Victoria Falls to Sakania in the Congo.

These locomotives were sometimes marked or branded as either BBR or LOG or both, but their status, whether leased or loaned, was unclear since they were still on the TFR roster and still often worked in South Africa as well.

Zambia Railways, the state-owned holding company, resumed control of the Zambian national rail network on 11 September 2012. This followed the Zambian government's decision to revoke the operating concession which had been awarded to RSZ after Finance Minister Alexander Chikwanda claimed that RSZ had "blatantly disregarded the provisions of the agreement" and had been "acting in a manner prejudicial to the interests of Zambians”.

Sheltam
One of the Class  locomotives, no. , was sold to Sheltam where it became their no. 4, having since been renumbered to 2601. Sheltam is a locomotive hire and repair company which undertakes complete operating contracts and maintenance contracts, based at the Douglas Colliery near Witbank in Mpumalanga. By the turn of the millennium, Sheltam locomotives were operating at Randfontein Estates Gold Mine in Gauteng, in Mpumalanga at Douglas and Vandyksdrift Collieries and at SAPPI, Ngodwana. They also operated on Spoornet's Newcastle-Utrecht branch in KwaZulu-Natal and for a while on Kei Rail in the Eastern Cape. Outside South Africa, they operate on the BBR, NLL and RSZ lines through Zimbabwe and Zambia and in the Congo.

Works numbers
The Class 34-200 builder's works numbers and known deployment are listed in the table.

Liveries
The Class 34-200 were all delivered in the SAR Gulf Red livery with signal red buffer beams, yellow side stripes on the long hood sides and a yellow V on each end. In the 1990s they began to be repainted in the Spoornet orange livery with a yellow and blue chevron pattern on the buffer beams.

Illustration
The main picture shows the right hand side of no.  in the Spoornet orange livery. The left side and the NLPI LOG livery as applied to Class  locomotives are illustrated below.

References

3360
C-C locomotives
Co′Co′ locomotives
Co+Co locomotives
Electro-Motive Division locomotives
Cape gauge railway locomotives
Railway locomotives introduced in 1971
1971 in South Africa